Corporal George Jarratt VC (20 July 1891 − 3 May 1917) was a British Army soldier and an English recipient of the Victoria Cross (VC) the highest and most prestigious award for gallantry in the face of the enemy that can be awarded to British and Commonwealth forces.

World War I
Jarratt was awarded the VC for a deed which took place when he was 25 years old on 3 May 1917 near Pelves, France. He was a corporal in the 8th Battalion, The Royal Fusiliers, British Army during the First World War.

Citation

Jarratt's wife Gertrude and their daughter Joyce received his medal from the King on 21 July 1917. His VC is displayed at the Royal Fusiliers Museum in the Tower of London.

References

Monuments to Courage (David Harvey, 1999)
The Register of the Victoria Cross (This England, 1997)

External links
Royal Fusiliers Recipients of the Victoria Cross
Stockwell War Memorial

1891 births
1917 deaths
Royal Fusiliers soldiers
British World War I recipients of the Victoria Cross
British military personnel killed in World War I
British Army personnel of World War I
People from Kennington
British World War I prisoners of war
British Army recipients of the Victoria Cross
Military personnel from London